Greg Hall may refer to:

Greg Hall (politician) (born 1948), Australian politician and independent member of the Tasmanian Legislative Council
Greg Hall (filmmaker) (born 1980), English film director, producer, cinematographer and screenwriter
Greg Hall (poet) (1946–2009), American poet
Greg Hall (jockey), retired Australian jockey